The Wisconsin Fellowship of Baptist Churches (WFBC) is an organization of fundamental independent Baptist churches in the U.S. state of Wisconsin.

This fellowship began in 1950 as the Conservative Baptist Association of Wisconsin. This association was sympathetic to, but not officially affiliated with, the Conservative Baptist Association of America, an association organized because of what many felt was growing liberalism in the old Northern Baptist Convention. At its annual meeting in 1969, the Conservative Baptist Association of Wisconsin changed its name to Wisconsin Fellowship of Baptist Churches. WFBC offices are located in Lebanon, Wisconsin.

References

External links
Wisconsin Fellowship of Baptist Churches
WFBC Church Directory Map

Independent Baptist denominations in the United States
Christian organizations established in 1950
Baptist Christianity in Wisconsin
Baptist denominations established in the 20th century
1950 establishments in Wisconsin